The Hvar Channel is a channel in the Adriatic Sea between the islands of Brač and Hvar.

References

External links
 

Adriatic Sea